Weird fiction is a subgenre of speculative fiction originating in the late 19th and early 20th centuries. Weird fiction either eschews or radically reinterprets ghosts, vampires, werewolves, and other traditional antagonists of supernatural horror fiction. Writers on the subject of weird fiction, such as China Miéville, sometimes use "the tentacle" to represent this type of writing. The tentacle is a limb-type absent from most of the monsters of European folklore and gothic fiction, but often attached to the monstrous creatures created by weird fiction writers, such as William Hope Hodgson, M. R. James, Clark Ashton Smith, and H. P. Lovecraft. Weird fiction often attempts to inspire awe as well as fear in response to its fictional creations, causing commentators like Miéville to paraphrase Goethe in saying that weird fiction evokes a sense of the numinous. Although "weird fiction" has been chiefly used as a historical description for works through the 1930s, it experienced a resurgence in the 1980s and 1990s, under the labels of New Weird and Slipstream, which continues into the 21st century.

Definitions
John Clute defines weird fiction as a term "used loosely to describe fantasy, supernatural fiction and horror tales embodying transgressive material". China Miéville defines it as "usually, roughly, conceived of as a rather breathless and generically slippery macabre fiction, a dark fantastic ('horror' plus 'fantasy') often featuring nontraditional alien monsters (thus plus 'science fiction')". Discussing the "Old Weird Fiction" published in the late 19th and early 20th centuries, Jeffrey Andrew Weinstock says, "Old Weird fiction utilises elements of horror, science fiction and fantasy to showcase the impotence and insignificance of human beings within a much larger universe populated by often malign powers and forces that greatly exceed the human capacities to understand or control them." Jeff and Ann VanderMeer describe weird fiction as a mode of literature, usually appearing within the horror fiction genre, rather than a separate genre of fiction in its own right.

History
Although the term "weird fiction" did not appear until the 20th century, Edgar Allan Poe is often regarded as the pioneering author of weird fiction. Poe was identified by Lovecraft as the first author of a distinct type of supernatural fiction different from traditional Gothic literature, and later commentators on the term have also suggested Poe was the first "weird fiction" writer. Sheridan Le Fanu is also seen as an early writer working in the sub-genre.

Literary critics in the nineteenth century would sometimes use the term "weird" to describe supernatural fiction. For instance, the Scottish Review in an 1859 article praised Poe, E. T. A. Hoffmann and Walter Scott by saying the three writers had the "power of weird imagination". The Irish magazine The Freeman's Journal, in an 1898 review of Dracula by Bram Stoker, described the novel as "wild and weird" and not Gothic. Weinstock has suggested there was a period of "Old Weird Fiction" that lasted from the late 19th to early 20th centuries. S. T. Joshi and Miéville have both argued that there was a period of "Haute Weird" between 1880 and 1940, when authors important to Weird Fiction, such as Arthur Machen and Clark Ashton Smith were publishing their work.

In the late nineteenth century, there were a number of British writers associated with the Decadent movement who wrote what was later described as weird fiction. These writers included Machen, M. P. Shiel, Count Eric Stenbock, and R. Murray Gilchrist. Other pioneering British weird fiction writers included Algernon Blackwood, William Hope Hodgson, Lord Dunsany, Arthur Machen, and M. R. James.

The American pulp magazine Weird Tales published many such stories in the United States from March 1923 to September 1954. The magazine's editor Farnsworth Wright often used the term "weird fiction" to describe the type of material that the magazine published. The writers who wrote for the magazine Weird Tales are thus closely identified with the weird fiction subgenre, especially H. P. Lovecraft, Clark Ashton Smith, Fritz Leiber and Robert Bloch. Other pulp magazines that published weird fiction included Strange Tales (edited by Harry Bates), and Unknown Worlds (edited by John W. Campbell).

H. P. Lovecraft popularised the term "weird fiction" in his essays. In "Supernatural Horror in Literature", Lovecraft gives his definition of weird fiction:
The true weird tale has something more than secret murder, bloody bones, or a sheeted form clanking chains according to rule. A certain atmosphere of breathless and unexplainable dread of outer, unknown forces must be present; and there must be a hint, expressed with a seriousness and portentousness becoming its subject, of that most terrible conception of the human brain—a malign and particular suspension or defeat of those fixed laws of Nature which are our only safeguard against the assaults of chaos and the daemons of unplumbed space.

S. T. Joshi describes several subdivisions of the weird tale: supernatural horror (or fantastique), the ghost story, quasi science fiction, fantasy, and ambiguous horror fiction and argues that "the weird tale" is primarily the result of the philosophical and aesthetic predispositions of the authors associated with this type of fiction.

Although Lovecraft was one of the few early 20th-century writers to describe his work as "weird fiction", the term has enjoyed a contemporary revival in New Weird fiction. For example, China Miéville often refers to his work as weird fiction. Many horror writers have also situated themselves within the weird tradition, including Clive Barker, who describes his fiction as fantastique, and Ramsey Campbell, whose early work was deeply influenced by Lovecraft.

Notable authors
The following notable authors have been described as writers of weird fiction. They are listed alphabetically by last name, and organised by the time period when they began to publish weird fiction.

Before 1940

 Ryūnosuke Akutagawa
 Roberto Arlt
 R. H. Barlow
 E.F. Benson
 Ambrose Bierce
 Algernon Blackwood
 Robert Bloch
 Marjorie Bowen
 John Buchan
 Leonora Carrington
 Robert W. Chambers
 Leonard Cline
 Mary Elizabeth Counselman
 Walter de la Mare
 August Derleth
 Lord Dunsany
 E. R. Eddison
 Guy Endore
 Robert Murray Gilchrist
 Stefan Grabiński
 Sakutarō Hagiwara
 L. P. Hartley
 W.F. Harvey
 Nathaniel Hawthorne
 Lafcadio Hearn
 Georg Heym
 William Hope Hodgson
 E. T. A. Hoffmann
 Robert E. Howard
 Carl Jacobi
 Henry James
 M.R. James
 Franz Kafka
 C. F. Keary
 Alfred Kubin
 Henry Kuttner
 Vernon Lee
 Joseph Sheridan Le Fanu
 Fritz Leiber
 David Lindsay
 Frank Belknap Long
 H. P. Lovecraft
 Arthur Machen
 Daphne du Maurier
 Abraham Merrit
 Gustav Meyrink
 C. L. Moore
 Fitz James O'Brien
 Oliver Onions
 Thomas Owen
 Edgar Allan Poe
 Horacio Quiroga
 Edogawa Ranpo
 Jean Ray
 Tod Robbins
 Eric Frank Russell
 Bruno Schulz
 Marcel Schwob
 Walter Scott
 Mary Shelley
 M. P. Shiel
 William Milligan Sloane III
 Clark Ashton Smith
 Eric Stenbock
 Francis Stevens
 Bram Stoker
 Theodore Sturgeon
 E. H. Visiak
 H. Russell Wakefield
 Hugh Walpole
 Evangeline Walton
 Donald Wandrei
 Howard Wandrei
 H. G. Wells
 Edward Lucas White
 Henry S. Whitehead

1940–1980

 Robert Aickman
 J. G. Ballard
 Charles Beaumont
 Olympe Bhely-Quenum
 Jerome Bixby
 Jorge Luis Borges
 Ray Bradbury
 William S. Burroughs
 Octavia E. Butler
 Ramsey Campbell
 Angela Carter
 Julio Cortázar
 Philip K. Dick
 Thomas M. Disch
 Harlan Ellison
 Philippe Druillet
 Philip José Farmer
 Shirley Jackson
 Stephen King
 Tanith Lee
 George R. R. Martin
 Richard Matheson
 Augusto Monterroso
 Michael Moorcock
 Haruki Murakami
 Joyce Carol Oates
 Mervyn Peake
 Joanna Russ
 Sarban
 William Sansom
 Claude Seignolle
 Margaret St. Clair
 Peter Straub
 James Tiptree, Jr.
 Amos Tutuola
 Jack Vance
 Karl Edward Wagner
 Manly Wade Wellman
 Gahan Wilson
 Gene Wolfe

1980–present

 Daniel Abraham
 Michal Ajvaz
 Nathan Ballingrud
 Clive Barker
 Laird Barron
 David Beauchard
 K. J. Bishop
 James P. Blaylock
 Giannina Braschi
 Poppy Z. Brite
 Kevin Brockmeier
 Charles Burns
 Jonathan Carroll
 David F. Case
 Michael Chabon
 Michael Cisco
 Nancy Collins
 Brendan Connell
 Mark Z. Danielewski
Junot Diaz
 Doug Dorst
 Michael Dougherty
 Hal Duncan
 Katherine Dunn
 Dennis Etchison
 Brian Evenson
 Paul Di Filippo
 Jeffrey Ford
 Karen Joy Fowler
 Neil Gaiman
 Felix Gilman
 Jean Giraud
 Elizabeth Hand
 M. John Harrison
 Brian Hodge
 Wolfgang Hohlbein
 Simon Ings
 Junji Ito
 Alejandro Jodorowsky
 Stephen Graham Jones
 Caitlín R. Kiernan
 T. E. D. Klein
 Kathe Koja
 Leena Krohn
 Marc Laidlaw
 Jay Lake
 Margo Lanagan
 John Langan
 Joe R. Lansdale
 Deborah Levy
 Thomas Ligotti
 Kelly Link
 Brian Lumley
 Carmen Maria Machado
 Michael McDowell
 Lincoln Michel
 China Miéville
 Sarah Monette
 Grant Morrison
 Reza Negarestani
 Scott Nicolay
 Jeff Noon
 David Ohle
 Ben Okri
 Otsuichi
 Helen Oyeyemi
 Benoît Peeters
 Cameron Pierce
 Rachel Pollack
 Tim Powers
 W. H. Pugmire
 Joseph S. Pulver, Sr.
 Cat Rambo
 Alistair Rennie
 Matt Ruff
 Sofia Samatar
 François Schuiten
 Lucius Shepard
 William Browning Spencer
 Simon Strantzas
 Charles Stross
 Oh Seong-dae
 R. L. Stine
 Steph Swainston
 Jeffrey Thomas
 Karin Tidbeck
 Lisa Tuttle
 Steven Utley
 Jeff VanderMeer
 Aliya Whiteley
 Liz Williams
 Chet Williamson
 F. Paul Wilson
 Christopher Howard Wolf

The New Weird

Ann and Jeff VanderMeer and China Miéville have suggested that Weird fiction has seen a recent resurgence, a phenomenon they term the New Weird. Tales which fit this category, as well as extensive discussion of the phenomenon, appear in the anthology The New Weird.

See also
 Cosmic horror
 Cthulhu Mythos
 Dark fantasy
 List of genres
 Lovecraftian horror
 Occult detective
 Surrealism
 Urban fantasy

Notes

References

External links
 H. P. Lovecraft, "Notes on Writing Weird Fiction"
 WeirdTalesMagazine.com, the original magazine of weird fiction
 WeirdFictionReview.com, a website by Ann and Jeff VanderMeer dedicated to the genre

 
Horror fiction
Horror genres
Speculative fiction
Science fantasy
Fantasy genres